Giakumis Georgios Kodogiannis Valencia (born April 13, 1992) is a Chilean former footballer who played as a forward.

Career
As a child, he was with El Esfuerzo of the Alejo Barrios Association, joining Santiago Wanderers youth system in 2008. In addition, he was in the Premier Soccer Academy from Ohio, United States. In Chile he also played for Deportes Puerto Montt, Unión La Calera, San Luis and Deportes Limache.

References

External links
 
 
 Giakumis Kodogiannis at PlaymakerStats

1992 births
Living people
Chilean people of Greek descent
Sportspeople from Valparaíso
Chilean footballers
Santiago Wanderers footballers
Puerto Montt footballers
Unión La Calera footballers
San Luis de Quillota footballers
Deportes Limache footballers
Chilean Primera División players
Primera B de Chile players
Chilean expatriate footballers
Chilean expatriate sportspeople in the United States
Expatriate soccer players in the United States
Association football forwards